Prefoldin subunit 6 is a protein that in humans is encoded by the PFDN6 gene.

References

Further reading